Per Eric Svartvadet (born May 17, 1975) is a Swedish former professional ice hockey player.

Svartvadet was drafted by the Dallas Stars in the 1993 NHL Entry Draft in the 6th round, as the 139th pick overall. In the summer of 1999 he was traded to the Atlanta Thrashers. He made his debut for the Thrashers in the 1999–2000 season, and also spent time with the Orlando Solar Bears that season. He spent four seasons in North America, before returning home to his native Sweden to play for Modo Hockey in 2003. The team won the Swedish championship in 2007, and this season Svartvadet was also given the Guldpucken, as the Most Valuable Player in the league.

Career statistics

Regular season and playoffs

International

External links

1975 births
Living people
Atlanta Thrashers players
Chicago Wolves players
Dallas Stars draft picks
Modo Hockey players
Orlando Solar Bears (IHL) players
People from Sollefteå Municipality
Swedish expatriate ice hockey players in the United States
Swedish ice hockey centres
Sportspeople from Västernorrland County